The 2016–17 season will be Újpest FC's 111th competitive season, 105th consecutive season in the OTP Bank Liga and 131st year in existence as a football club.

First Team Squad

New contracts

Transfers

In

Summer

Statistics

Appearances and goals

Top scorers
Includes all competitive matches. The list is sorted by shirt number when total goals are equal.

Last updated on 21 August 2016

Overall
{|class="wikitable"
|-
|Games played || 6 (6 OTP Bank Liga, 0 Hungarian Cup)
|-
|Games won || 4 (4 OTP Bank Liga, 0 Hungarian Cup)
|-
|Games drawn || 0 (0 OTP Bank Liga, 0 Hungarian Cup)
|-
|Games lost || 2 (2 OTP Bank Liga, 0 Hungarian Cup)
|-
|Goals scored || 8
|-
|Goals conceded || 5
|-
|Goal difference || +3
|-
|Yellow cards || 18
|-
|Red cards || 0
|-
|rowspan="1"|Worst discipline ||  Nemanja Andrić (3 , 0 )
|-
|rowspan="1"|Best result || 2–0 (A) v Mezőkövesd – OTP Bank Liga – 17-08-2016
|-
|rowspan="1"|Worst result || 0–2 (H) v Honvéd – OTP Bank Liga – 16-07-2016
|-
|rowspan="10"|Most appearances ||  Tibor Nagy (6 appearances)
|-
|  Benjámin Cseke (6 appearances)
|-
|  József Windecker (6 appearances)
|-
|  Dávid Mohl (6 appearances)
|-
|  Bojan Sanković (6 appearances)
|-
|  Nemanja Andrić (6 appearances)
|-
|  Souleymane Diarra (6 appearances)
|-
|  Benjamin Balázs (6 appearances)
|-
|  Bence Pávkovics (6 appearances)
|-
|  János Lázok (6 appearances)
|-
|rowspan="1"|Top scorers ||  Enis Bardhi (3 goals)
|-
|Points || 12/18 (66.66%)
|-

Friendlies

Pre-season

Nemzeti bajnokság I

Matches

Magyar Kupa

League table

Results by round

Results summary

References 

Újpest FC seasons
Ujpest